The 2019 Argentina Women's Hockey National Tournament was the 11th edition of the women's national tournament. It was going to be held from 3 to 6 October 2019 in Mendoza, Argentina.

Mendoza achieved its third title after beating Cordoba 3-0 at the final.

Squads
Players followed with a country flag are those involved in its senior national team.

Amateur Field Hockey Association of Buenos Aires

Head coach: Agustín Lavagno

Bahía Blanca's Hockey Association

Head coach: Sergio Nasso

Córdoba's Hockey Federation

Head coach: Miguel Ángel Rivera

Mendoza's Hockey Association

Head coach: José González

Misiones' Hockey Association

Head coach: Matías Petit

Litoral's Hockey Association

Head coach: José Luis Oro

Santa Fe's Hockey Federation

Head coach: Ariel Pérez Carli

Tucumán's Hockey Association

Head coach: Alberto Darnay

Results

Pool A

Pool B

Awards
Best player of the tournament: Julieta Jankunas
Best player at the final: Gianella Palet
Best goalkeeper: Paula Pasquetín
Top goalscorer: Julieta Jankunas

Final standings

References

2019
2019 in women's field hockey
October 2019 sports events in South America
Hockey